Madness, Money & Music is the third album by singer Sheena Easton. It was released in 1982 and produced by Christopher Neil. The album includes the singles "I Wouldn't Beg for Water" (US number 64) and "Machinery" (US number 57, UK number 38), as well as the UK single "Are You Man Enough".

The album featured an early recording of the song "Wind Beneath My Wings", which would later be famously covered by Bette Midler and others. It also included the first recording of "You Do It", subsequently recorded by Diana Ross and Rita Coolidge, and a cover of Janis Ian's classic "In The Winter".

The album was one of Easton's lower-charting efforts, reaching number 85 in the United States and number 44 in the UK, but was more successful in Scandinavia and went Gold in Canada. Easton promoted the album by way of an hour-long special Act One, produced for American television and syndicated worldwide, during which she performed a number of songs from the album and embarked on her first world tour.

A CD reissue in 2000 added the bonus tracks and B-sides from One Way Records. On February 23, 2013, Edsel Records (UK) reissued Easton's "You Could Have Been with Me" & "Madness, Money and Music" in two compact disc packages remastered with bonus tracks. On November 24, 2014, the album was included in an Original Album Series box set in the UK with all of Easton's first five albums with EMI through Warner Music Group.

UK Track listing

Side One
 "Weekend in Paris" (Sue Quinn) - 4:10
 "Are You Man Enough" (Billy Livsey, Graham Lyle) - 3:28
"I Wouldn't Beg for Water" (Michael Leeson, Peter Vale) - 4:16
"Machinery" (Julia Downes) - 3:01
"Ice Out in the Rain" (Michael Leeson, Peter Vale) - 4:46
"I Don't Need Your Word" (Michael Leeson, Peter Vale) - 3:22
Side Two
"Madness Money and Music" (Barry Black, Brian Chatton) - 3:54
"There When I Needed You" (John Lewis Parker, Steve Kipner) - 3:01
"Wind Beneath My Wings" (Larry Henley, Jeff Silbar) - 4:04
"You Do It" (Deborah Allen, Eddie Struzick) - 3:41
"In the Winter" (Janis Ian) - 3:10
"Please Don't Sympathise" (Steve Thompson) - 3:33

US Track listing 
The US version of the album dropped two tracks ("I Don't Need Your Word" and "Please Don't Sympathise"), and reshuffled the track order.

Side One
 "Machinery"
 "Weekend in Paris"
"I Wouldn't Beg for Water"
 "Are You Man Enough"
 "Ice Out in the Rain"
Side Two
 "Madness Money and Music"
 "Wind Beneath My Wings"
 "There When I Needed You"
 "In the Winter"
 "You Do It"

CD Bonus tracks:
 "Some of Us Will" (Phil Palmer) - 3:33
 "Loner" (Peter Vale) - 2:38
 "So We Say Goodbye" (Ian Lynn) - 2:08

Personnel 
 Sheena Easton – lead and backing vocals
 Bias Boshell – keyboards
 Ian Lynn – synthesizers
 Micky Moody – guitars
 Phil Palmer – guitars
 Mo Foster – bass 
 Peter Van Hooke – drums
 Frank Ricotti – percussion
 Tony Hall – saxophones
 Chris Hunter – saxophones
 Guy Barker – trumpets
 Alan Carvell – backing vocals
 John Kirby – backing vocals
 Christopher Neil – backing vocals

Production 
 Producer – Christopher Neil
 Engineer – Nick Ryan
 Recorded at AIR Studios (Montserrat, West Indies).
 Mastered by Steve Rooke at Strawberry Mastering (London, England).
 Design – Roy R. Guzman
 Photography – Brian Aris

References
[ Madness, Money & Music] at Allmusic

1982 albums
Sheena Easton albums
Albums produced by Christopher Neil
EMI Records albums
Albums recorded at AIR Studios